Cold Fire is the third book in the series The Circle Opens by author Tamora Pierce. It deals with the continuing adventures of child mage Daja Kisubo and her teacher, the dedicate initiate Frostpine.

Plot introduction
Daja and Frostpine expect to have a peaceful winter's visit with old friends in Kugisko, a port in the vast empire of Namorn. But there is no peace when mysterious fires begin to blaze across the vulnerable city. Daja assists Bennat Ladradun, a local firefighter with a tragic past, to fight the flames. The two become fast friends—until they realize the fires have been deliberately set, and their relationship is deeply tested. Daja's magic helps her track down the firestarter, but no magic can protect her or Ben from the effects of madness and betrayal.

Plot summary
As part of their travels, Daja and Frostpine are staying with some friends of Frostpine's from his days of studies as a Goldsmith, the Bancanor family. While they are staying there, Daja realized that the two eldest daughters of the family possess ambient magic. She devises a metal scrying mirror to test the twin daughters Niamara (Nia) and Jorality (Jory)'s aspect of magics. Shy, quiet Nia is discovered to possess Carpentry magic and loud, impatient Jory if found to possess Cooking magic.

As Daja is considered an adult by the Winding circle, a fact that is acknowledged with the entrustment of her mage medallion, she is responsible for aiding those whom she personally discovers as having magic. However, because of her lack of skill and magic in either of the twins' disciplines, she  investigates and eventually entrusts the twins to local mages for instructions pertaining to the development of their craft. However, Daja retains responsibility for teaching them to meditate, as both areas of instruction for the twins are loud areas where teaching of meditation is inadvisable. Since the twins are complete opposites in personality, this proves to be a challenging task.

Meanwhile, Daja makes friends with a local non-magical firefighter, Ben Ladradun. He is trying to form an organized much needed fire brigade from the villagers, but is facing issues from lack of funding. As Kugisko is a village with houses built mainly of wood, fires in the area were not uncommon, yet increasing in number throughout Daja's stay.

Daja and Ben suspect that many if not all of the recent fires were set on purpose. As Ben searches to discover the "fire-bug", Daja works tirelessly to make Ben a pair of living metal gloves to protect his hands from harm when handling fire burning debris.

Daja ends up saving many people from burning buildings as the number of fires increases.

In the end it is revealed that Ben is the "fire-bug" and Daja captures him and gives him to the authorities; who end up burning him to death. Ben set fires because the only time he got respect was when he was a victim of the flames or when he was fighting them. His emotionally and physically abusive mother created his twisted way of thinking.

Characters 
Daja Kisubo – Daja is a metal-mage. She is part of a group of young mages who have become famous over the last four years. Daja has learned to create 'living metal' due to an accident in Daja's Book. This metal has a mind of its own.

Frostpine – Frostpine is the best metal-mage in the world. As Daja's teacher, he plays a very large role in her education as well as that of the twins.

Nia – Niamara (Nia) is the quieter of the twins. She has carpentry magic. A marriage between her and one of the shipbuilder's sons is being talked about.

Jory – Jorality (Jory) is loud and outgoing. Her magic deals with cooking and she can see magic (as can Nia).

References 

Emelanese books
2002 American novels
2002 fantasy novels